Storm over Tjurö (Swedish: Storm över Tjurö) is a 1954 Swedish drama film directed by Arne Mattsson and starring Adolf Jahr, Sigge Fürst and Gunnel Broström. It was shot at the Centrumateljéerna Studios in Stockholm. The film's sets were designed by the art director Nils Nilsson. It was based on the 1935 novel of the same title by Gustaf Hellström.

Cast
 Adolf Jahr as 	Karl Oskar Bohm
 Sigge Fürst as 	Gottfrid Johansson
 Gunnel Broström as 	Tekla Bladh
 Margaretha Krook as 	Augusta 
 Märta Dorff as 	Mrs. Sofia Bohm
 Nils Hallberg as 	Nicklas Boutkiewics
 Åke Grönberg as 	Reinhold Karlsson
 Georg Rydeberg as 	Gustafson, Secretary
 Gösta Gustafson as 	Sjöholm
 Sif Ruud as 	Alma Persson
 Erik Hell as 	Vicar
 Lissi Alandh as 	Lisa, Waitress
 John Norrman as 	Parish Constable
 Axel Högel as 	Judge
 John Melin as	Zachrisson
 Svea Holst as 	Midwife
 Astrid Bodin as 	Woman 
 Stig Johanson as 	Local Inhabitant
 Elsa Ebbesen as 	Maria, the Vicar's Housemaid 
 Åke Lindström as Sailor 
 Wilma Malmlöf as 	Curious Woman
 Georg Skarstedt as Johansson, Sofia's Father 
 Brita Öberg as 	Sofia's Mother
 Birger Åsander as Captain at Östanå I

References

Bibliography 
 Krawc, Alfred. International Directory of Cinematographers, Set- and Costume Designers in Film: Denmark, Finland, Norway, Sweden (from the beginnings to 1984). Saur, 1986.
 Warme, Lars G. A History of Swedish Literature. University of Nebraska Press, 1 Jan 1996.

External links 
 

1954 films
Swedish drama films
1954 drama films
1950s Swedish-language films
Films directed by Arne Mattsson
Films based on Swedish novels
1950s Swedish films